Charles Harris (born March 6, 1995) is an American football defensive end for the Detroit Lions of the National Football League (NFL). He played college football at Missouri and was drafted by the Miami Dolphins in the first round of the 2017 NFL Draft.

Early years
Harris attended Lincoln College Preparatory Academy in Kansas City, Missouri. As a junior, he had 40 tackles and six sacks and as a senior had 60 tackles and 12 sacks. He also had 15 receptions for 285 and five touchdowns. He committed to the University of Missouri to play college football. Harris also played basketball in high school and took boxing classes.

College career
After redshirting his first year at Missouri in 2013, Harris appeared in all 14 games as a redshirt freshman in 2014, recording 19 tackles and two sacks. Harris took over as a starter in 2015 and had 56 tackles and seven sacks.

Professional career
Harris was invited to the NFL Combine and completed all the drills except for the short shuttle and three cone drill. He participated at Missouri's Pro Day and chose to perform positional drills and the short shuttle, three cone drill, vertical jump, and broad jump. Going into the draft, he was projected to be a first or second round pick by NFL draft experts and analysts. He was ranked the seventh best edge rusher by Sports Illustrated, the third best linebacker by ESPN, and was ranked the fifth best defensive end by NFL analyst Bucky Brooks, Mike Mayock, and NFLDraftScout.com.

Miami Dolphins
The Miami Dolphins selected Harris in the first round (22nd overall) of the 2017 NFL Draft.

Atlanta Falcons
On May 1, 2020, the Dolphins traded Harris to the Atlanta Falcons for a 2021 seventh-round draft pick. The next day, the Falcons declined the fifth-year option on Harris' contract, making him a free agent in 2021.
In Week 8 against the Carolina Panthers on Thursday Night Football, Harris was ejected from the game after hitting quarterback Teddy Bridgewater's head while he was sliding.

Detroit Lions
On March 19, 2021, Harris signed with the Detroit Lions.

On March 18, 2022, Harris signed a two-year, $13 million contract extension with the Lions. He was placed on injured reserve on November 28.

References

External links

Missouri Tigers bio

1995 births
Living people
Players of American football from Kansas City, Missouri
American football defensive ends
Missouri Tigers football players
Miami Dolphins players
Atlanta Falcons players
Detroit Lions players